Crass is a surname.

Notable people with the name include:

 Bill Crass (1911–1996), American football player
 Chris Crass (born c. 1973), American activist
 Derrick Crass (born 1960), American weightlifter
 Franz Crass (1928–2012), German singer

See also
 Krass (surname)